Leopoldo Salcedo Production (also known as LGS Films short for Leopoldo Ganal Salcedo Films) was a Philippine movie outfit formed by actor Leopoldo Salcedo.  It produced 13 films, including the blockbusters Divisoria...Quiapo... (1955) and La Roca Trinidad (1951).

References

Entertainment companies of the Philippines
Mass media in Metro Manila